Luke Vercollone (born April 4, 1982 in Norwalk, Connecticut) is a former American soccer player who previously played for Colorado Springs Switchbacks in the United Soccer League.

Career

Youth and College
Vercollone grew up in Pembroke, Massachusetts and attended Silver Lake Regional High School where he was a letterman in soccer and wrestling, and won All-Conference honors and All-State honors. He played college soccer for Seton Hall, where he was named to the All-Big East first team his senior season, finishing his career at with 11 goals and 24 assists.

Vercollone also played for the Cape Cod Crusaders of the USL Premier Development League, helping the team to consecutive PDL Championship titles in 2002 and 2003.

Professional
Vercollone was drafted 42nd overall in the 2004 MLS SuperDraft by the Columbus Crew, but was not offered a contract by the team. Instead, he was picked up by New England Revolution and signed to a developmental contract, but saw practically no time on the field his rookie season, playing a total of 2 minutes in two games. The Revolution released him to waivers following the 2005 season in which he played a total of 35 minutes in 3 games.

On April 10, 2006, Vercollone joined the Charleston Battery for the 2006 USL First Division season. In two seasons with the Battery, he made 66 appearances, scoring three goals and six assists for 12 points overall. In January 2008 Vercollone signed for the Richmond Kickers of the USL Second Division, and was part of the Kickers team which won the 2009 USL Second Division championship. On January 14, 2010 Richmond announced the re-signing of Vercollone for the 2010 season.

Vercollone re-signed for a fourth season with Richmond on November 10, 2010. The club signed him for the 2012 season on September 22, 2011.

Colorado Springs Switchbacks FC

On October 19, 2014 it was announced that Vercollone was the first ever signing for new United Soccer League club Colorado Springs Switchbacks. Vercollone was also announced as the team's first captain.

Vercollone ended his first season with the Colorado Springs Switchbacks with 14 goals and 9 assists.

On October 26, 2015 it was announced that Vercollone was in the United Soccer League All-League Team.

On December 4, 2015 it was announced that Vercollone would return to United Soccer League club Colorado Springs Switchbacks for the 2016 United Soccer League season.
On March 6, 2016 Vercollone scored 2 goals in a 3–1 victory against Colorado State-Pueblo University in a preseason game. On March 12, 2016 Vercollone scored in a 3–2 preseason victory against UCCS. On March 15, 2016 Vercollone scored in a 4–0 preseason win against Ventura County Fusion.

On October 15, 2018, following the conclusion of his fourth season with the Colorado Springs Switchbacks, Vercollone announced his retirement from professional soccer in an exclusive interview with Last Word on Soccer's Mark Turner.  Vercollone concluded his career in Colorado Springs being the first player to represent the club more than 100 times, and leading all-time assists and goal scoring (28 goals, all competitions).

Honors

Cape Cod Crusaders
USL Premier Development League Champions (1): 2003

Richmond Kickers
USL Second Division Champions (1): 2009

Colorado Springs Switchbacks
United Soccer League First Team All-League (1): 2015

References

External links
Richmond Kickers bio
Charleston Battery bio

1982 births
Living people
American soccer players
New England Revolution players
Sportspeople from Norwalk, Connecticut
Cape Cod Crusaders players
Charleston Battery players
Major League Soccer players
USL First Division players
USL Second Division players
Richmond Kickers players
Colorado Springs Switchbacks FC players
People from Pembroke, Massachusetts
Seton Hall Pirates men's soccer players
USL League Two players
USL Championship players
Columbus Crew draft picks
Soccer players from Connecticut
Association football midfielders
Soccer players from Massachusetts
Sportspeople from Plymouth County, Massachusetts